Pachycerianthus fimbriatus is a cerianthid anemone that burrows in substrate and lives in a semi-rigid tube made of felted nematocysts. The anemone is often seen in bright orange to red.

Like most anemones, the tube-dwelling anemone contains stinging cells or nematocytes along its tentacles, however, the cells are not toxic to humans.

The ceriantharia possess two whorls of tentacles, one surrounding the mouth (labial tentacles) and one at the edge of the oral disc (marginal tentacles).

Distribution
This species was described from Indonesia. It is considered to be synonymous with Pachycerianthus plicatus which was described from the Pacific Ocean coast of North America.

Biology
Pachycerianthus fimbriatus feeds on small crustaceans. The giant nudibranch Dendronotus iris has been documented to prey upon P. fimbriatus.

References
2.

 The Comparative Toxicogenomics Database

External links
 

Cerianthidae
Animals described in 1910